The Test series ended 1-1 with 1 match drawn. Shaun Pollock became 28th test captain following the sacking of Hansie Cronje.

Test series summary

1st Test

2nd Test

3rd Test

2000 in South African cricket
2000 in Sri Lankan cricket
International cricket competitions from 1997–98 to 2000
2000
Sri Lankan cricket seasons from 1972–73 to 1999–2000